The 127th Wing is a composite wing of the United States Air Force and Michigan National Guard. It is composed of approximately 1,700 Citizen-Airmen and provides highly trained personnel, aircraft, and support resources to serve the Michigan community, the state and the United States. The wing operates Boeing KC-135 Stratotankers, providing global aerial refueling capability in support of Air Mobility Command, and the Fairchild Republic A-10 Thunderbolt II, flying the close air support mission for Air Combat Command. The current commander of the 127th Wing is Brig. Gen. Rolf E. Mammen. With approximately 1,700 personnel assigned, the 127th Wing is among the most complex Air National Guard wings. The 127th Wing's home station, Selfridge Air National Guard Base, is the largest facility managed by a reserve component (Air National Guard or U.S. Air Force Reserve) of the U.S. Air Force.

History 
In the fall of 1950, the Air National Guard reorganized its tactical units according to the United States Air Force's Wing Base Organization, which combined tactical and support units under a single wing.  On 1 November 1950, the 127th Fighter Wing was activated with the 127th Fighter, Air Base, Maintenance & Supply, and Medical Groups assigned.

In February 1951, the wing and groups were called to active duty.  Unlike other Air National Guard wings called to active duty for the Korean War, however, the 127th became part of Air Training Command and moved to Luke Air Force Base, Arizona, becoming the 127th Pilot Training Wing.  Seventeen members of the wing's 172nd Squadron had already volunteered for duty overeseas as members of the regular Air Force the previous month. The 197th Pilot Training Squadron of the Arizona Air National Guard, which was already at Luke, and equipped with Republic F-84 Thunderjets joined the wing.  The wing trained fighter pilots with North American F-51 Mustangs, Lockheed F-80 Shooting Stars and Republic F-84 Thunderjets.  On 1 November 1952, the wing was inactivated and returned to the Air National Guard as the 127th Fighter-Bomber Wing, transferring its equipment and most of its personnel at Luke to the newly formed 3600th Flying Training Wing.

In April 1962, Volunteer pilots and ground support personnel from the wing's 172nd Tactical Reconnaissance Squadron began training at Kirtland Air Force Base, New Mexico for Operation Blue Straw, nuclear tests conducted at Christmas Island in the middle of the Pacific Ocean. Flying specially equipped Martin RB-57 Canberras, their pilots flew through clouds of nuclear dust gather samples for study.

In July 1967, over 80 percent of the Michigan Air Guard's personnel were ordered on active duty to help deal with massive rioting, looting, and arson in Detroit. They guarded utility installations, rode with police and firefighters, guarded prisoners, and secured a base at the Detroit Metropolitan Airport. The 110th Tactical Reconnaissance Group was activated and the unit's Air Police contingent was flown to the city.  Its RB-57s flew over damaged parts of the city producing over 9,000 photos. By July 30 all unit personnel but the Air Police had been demobilized.

Prompted by a disastrous tornado in Lubbock, Texas, in 1970, the National Guard Bureau set up a pilot program for nationwide civil defense tornado aerial photographic assessment and assigned the mission to the wing's 110th Tactical Reconnaissance Group.

In September 1994, Air National Guard Lockheed C-130 Hercules units, including the wing's191st Airlift Group  units began supporting Operation Provide Comfort, providing humanitarian relief for Kurdish refugees displaced in Iraq from Incirlik Air Base, Turkey.

The wing also supported the Air Force Special Operations Command with its 107th Weather Flight (inactivated by 30 September 2017).

Lineage 
 Constituted c. 25 October 1950 as the 127th Fighter Wing and allotted to the Air National Guard
 Activated on 1 November 1950
 Called to active duty c. 1 February 1951
 Redesignated 127th Pilot Training Wing on 10 February 1951
 Inactivated on 1 November 1952 and returned to the Air National Guard
 Redesignated 127th Fighter-Bomber Wing and activated on 1 November 1952
 Redesignated 127th Fighter-Interceptor Wing on 1 July 1955
 Redesignated 127th Air Defense Wing on 16 April 1956
 Redesignated 127th Tactical Reconnaissance Wing on 12 April 1958
 Redesignated 127th Tactical Fighter Wing on 30 June 1972
 Redesignated 127th Fighter Wing on 31 March 1992
 Redesignated 127th Wing c. 1 January 1993

Assignments 
 Michigan Air National Guard, 1 November 1950
 Tenth Air Force, c. 1 February 1951
 Air Training Command, 10 February 1951
 Flying Training Air Force, 1 May 1951
 Crew Training Air Force, 1 March – 1 November 1952
 Michigan Air National Guard, 1 November 1952 – present

Components 
 Groups
 103d Tactical Fighter Group, c. 30 June 1972 – unknown
 110th Fighter Group (Air Defense) (later 110th Tactical Reconnaissance Group), 15 April 1956 – 11 June 1972
 112th Tactical Fighter Group, c. 12 April 1975 – c.16 October 1991
 127th Fighter Group (later 127th Pilot Training Group, 127th Fighter-Bomber Group, 127th Fighter-Interceptor Group, 127th Fighter Group (Air Defense), 127th Tactical Reconnaissance Group, 127th Tactical Fighter Group, 127th Operations Group), 1 November 1950 – 1 November 1952, 1Noovember 1952 – 9 December 1974, c. 1 January 1993 – present
 127th Air Base Group, 1 November 1950 – 1 November 1952, 1 November 1952 – 15 April 1956, 12 April 1958 – 1 October 1962
 127th Combat Support Group (later 127th Combat Support Squadron, 127th Mission Support Squadron, 127th Support Group, 127th Mission Support Group), 9 December 1974 – present
 127th Maintenance & Supply Group (later 127th Logistics Group, 127th Maintenance Group), 1 November 1950 – 1 November 1952, 1 November 1952 – 15 April 1956, 12 April 1958 – c. 1 December 1959, c. 1 January 1993 – present
 127th Medical Group (later 127th Tactical Hospital, 127th USAF Dispensary, 127th Tactical Clinic, 127th Medical Squadron, 127th Medical Group), 1 November 1950 – 1 November 1952, 1 November 1952 – present
 155th Tactical Reconnaissance Group, c. 1 May 1964 – c. 1 June 1972
 169th Tactical Fighter Group (later 169th Fighter Group), 5 April 1975 – c. 16 October 1995
 188th Tactical Reconnaissance Group, c. August 1965 – 15 June 1972
 191st Tactical Reconnaissance Group (later 191st Fighter Group, 191st Airlift Group, 127th Air Refueling Group), 1 October 1962 – 1 July 1967, 1968 – c. 21 July 1972, 15 March 1992 – 1 April 1996, 1 May 1999 – present

 Operational squadrons
 107th Tactical Fighter Squadron (later 107th Fighter Squadron), 9 December 1974 – c. 1 December 1993
 171st Fighter-Interceptor Squadron, 15 April 1956 – c. 1 January 1958

Stations 
 Wayne County Airport, 1 November 1950
 Luke Air Force Base, Arizona, 23 February 1951 – I November 1952
 Wayne County Airport (later Detroit Air National Guard Base), 1 November 1952
 Selfridge Air Force Base (later Selfridge Air National Guard Base), c. 1 January 1993

Awards

References

Notes
 Explanatory notes

 Citations

Bibliography

 
 

Wings of the United States Air National Guard
Composite wings of the United States Air Force
Military units and formations established in 1950